Younas Ahmadzai (born 16 November 1995) is an Afghan cricketer. He made his List A debut for Afghanistan A against Zimbabwe A during their tour to Zimbabwe on 27 January 2017. Prior to his List A debut, he was named in Afghanistan's squad for the 2014 Under-19 Cricket World Cup.

He made his Twenty20 debut for Speen Ghar Tigers in the 2017 Shpageeza Cricket League on 11 September 2017. He made his first-class debut for Band-e-Amir Region in the 2017–18 Ahmad Shah Abdali 4-day Tournament on 20 October 2017. In the final of the 2017–18 Ahmad Shah Abdali 4-day Tournament, batting for Band-e-Amir Region against Speen Ghar Region, he scored 210 not out in the first innings.

References

External links
 

1995 births
Living people
Afghan cricketers
Place of birth missing (living people)
Amo Sharks cricketers
Band-e-Amir Dragons cricketers